David Lee Holt (born December 6, 1960) is an American guitarist, vocalist and songwriter who is best known for being a member of the Austin-based group, Storyville, which included guitarist David Grissom, vocalist Malford
Milligan, and Stevie Ray Vaughan’s Double Trouble rhythm section, Tommy Shannon and Chris Layton. He has also toured and recorded with Carlene Carter, The Mavericks, and Joe Ely. In 2004, Holt released his only
solo effort, Perpetual Motion, on the Blue Corn Music label. He currently resides in Austin, Texas.

Career

Carlene Carter
In 1990, Holt was hired by Carlene Carter at the suggestion of her ex-husband, Nick Lowe, to join her U.S. tour in support of her Warner Bros. release, I Fell In Love.

The Mavericks
In 1991, Holt joined a Miami-based band, The Mavericks, on their debut MCA release, From Hell to Paradise. He toured with the band for a little over a year before leaving to join then MCA label-mate Joe Ely on his Love and Danger tour.

Storyville
In January, 1994, Holt was asked by Susan Antone of Austin blues club, Antone’s, to fill in for Derek O’Brien and host the long-running tradition blues jam known as Blue Monday. Holt invited Tommy Shannon, Chris Layton, and David Grissom to join him, and with the addition of vocalist Malford Milligan, Storyville was born. They had two releases on Atlantic Records — "A Piece of Your Soul" and "Dog Years". The band was together five years (1994-1999) and then reunited briefly in 2006 to produce the independently released DVD, Storyville Live at Antone’s.

Joe Ely
In 2006, Holt became a permanent member of the Joe Ely Band, and has appeared on several of Joe’s releases.

Discography

Solo

With Storyville

With The Mavericks

With Joe Ely

References

American country guitarists
1960 births
Living people
Country musicians from Texas
People from Dallas
The Mavericks members